The 1958–59 season was the 54th season of competitive football in Turkey.

Overview
The Milli Lig was introduced in 1959. At the time, there were three cities who had professional leagues: Ankara, Istanbul, and Izmir. The first league was made up of sixteen clubs, with eight from Istanbul, and four each from Ankara and Izmir. To gain entry, qualification tournaments were held in 1958 to decide who would participate in the league. League play did not start until the second half of the season, causing the season to be played in group format and a shorter game schedule.

The first final was held between Fenerbahçe S.K. and Galatasaray S.K. The match was a two legged knockout. Galatasaray won the first match 1-0, while Fenerbahçe won the second 4-0 and secured their first title by 4-1 aggregate.

This year was also earmarked by the first competition of a Turkish club in the European Cup. Fenerbahçe won the first match of the preliminary round 4-3 on aggregate over Csepel SC. Their second preliminary match came against OGC Nice. Fenerbahçe had tied after two legs, but lost the playoff leg 1-5.

Awards
Top scorer
Metin Oktay (Galatasaray S.K.) - 11 goals

Honours

Notes = Number in parentheses is the times that club has won that honour.

Final National league tables

Promotions
Four clubs were promoted through a promotion tournament called the Federasyon Kupası. This brought the league club total up to 20 for the 1959–60 season. The four clubs were Kasımpaşa S.K., Şeker Hilal, Altınordu S.K., and Feriköy G.K. There were no relegations.

National team
The Turkey national football team competed in six matches during the 1958-59 season. The team finished with a record of two wins, three draws, and one loss. Lefter Küçükandonyadis finished top scorer with two goals in six matches.

References

 
Seasons in Turkish football